The greater Cuban nesophontes (Nesophontes major) is an extinct species of eulipotyphlan that was native to Cuba.  It is thought that the introduction of rats lead to its demise.

References

Nesophontes
Extinct animals of Cuba
Mammals of the Caribbean
Mammal extinctions since 1500
Mammals described in 1970
Holocene extinctions
Endemic fauna of Cuba